Pravisht Mishra is an Indian television actor best known for his portrayal of Anirudh Roy Choudhary in Barrister Babu and Yuvan Singh Rathod in Banni Chow Home Delivery.

Personal life
Pravisht Mishra was born in Prayagraj, Uttar Pradesh and raised in Mumbai.

Career
Mishra started his career as Inspector Khare's son in 2011 film Shabri. In 2013, he made his television debut with a minor role of Teenage Devadatta in ZEE TV series Buddha. In 2014, he appeared as Prince Uttar in Starplus's mythological series Mahabharat. He then appeared in some other mythological shows like Siya Ke Ram where he portrayed as young Bharatha and in Suryaputra Karn as young Yudhistir.

In 2018, Mishra acted as the parallel lead Sahil Sanklecha in Sony TV's Mangalam Dangalam. From 2019 to 2020, he played the role of Pulkit Rastogi in Star Plus’s TV serial Kahaan Hum Kahaan Tum. Mishra made a breakthrough in his career by portraying the lead role of Anirudh Roy Choudhary in Colors's show Barrister Babu. Currently, he is seen playing the lead role of Yuvan Singh Rathod in Star Plus show Banni Chow Home Delivery.

Filmography

Films

Television

Web series

Awards and nominations

See also 
 List of Indian actors
 List of Indian television actors

References

External links 
 

Living people
Indian male soap opera actors
21st-century Indian male actors
Indian male television actors
Male actors in Hindi television
People from Allahabad
Actors from Uttar Pradesh
Year of birth missing (living people)